Phylica arborea, also known as the Island Cape myrtle, is a shrub or small tree with narrow needle-like dark green leaves, downy silver on the underside, and with greenish white terminal flowers.  Usually a shrub or procumbent tree, it may reach 6–7 m in height in sheltered locations.  It is found on various isolated islands, including the Tristan da Cunha group and Gough Island, in the South Atlantic Ocean, as well as Amsterdam Island in the southern Indian Ocean.

References

External links

arborea
Flora of Tristan da Cunha
Flora of Gough Island
Île Amsterdam
Plants described in 1808